RTC Transit is the name of the bus system in the Las Vegas metropolitan area of Clark County, Nevada. It is a subsidiary of the Regional Transportation Commission of Southern Nevada. While it services most of Clark County with regularly scheduled routes, most of the service is in the immediate Las Vegas Valley; outlying places such as Mesquite and Laughlin provide transit services to their residents via the Southern Nevada Transit Coalition, which uses several vehicles acquired from RTC Transit.

History

Las Vegas Transit 
The privately owned Las Vegas Transit System, Inc. ("LVT") provided bus service on the streets of Las Vegas for more than 40 years. LVT service mainly consisted of loop routes that made many turns throughout the city, sometimes doubling back on its own routes and making several "subloops" within a loop. At one point, LVT was named America's worst transit system.

The Regional Transportation Commission of Southern Nevada (RTCSNV or RTC) was formed in 1965 by state legislation to oversee federally-mandated transportation planning in Clark County. Under pressure by the county and state, and by order of the state court, the company was ordered to cease operations except on Route 6-The Strip and relinquish all its city-owned buses to the Regional Transportation Commission of Clark County as of November 15, 1992. LVT and its successors continued to operate service in competition with Citizens Area Transit until about 2005.

Citizens Area Transit era (1992–2008) 

Citizens Area Transit ("CAT") was formed by the RTC to provide reliable bus service to the cities of Las Vegas, North Las Vegas, Henderson, Las Vegas Township, Mesquite, and Laughlin. The system began on November 15, 1992 under the direction of Kurt Weinrich, its general manager. Initially the old LVT routes were operated unchanged except for route 6–The Strip, which LVT still retained. The system was totally reconfigured and Strip service begun December 5, 1992. The fleet consisted of mostly old vehicles such as Flxible Grummans, GMC RTSs, TMC RTSs and Gillig Phantoms. They had also purchased 90 new New Flyer D40HFs. The initial route structure was soon seen as deficient and  second complete revision was made in June on 1993. Soon after, CAT began to catch on with the city and blossomed. In 1997, the American Public Transportation Association awarded CAT with their highest honor, Best Transit System in America (within its category). However, things began to change in the following years. In 2002, The Amalgamated Transit Union and the bus contractor, ATC, began contract renewal negotiations, but the two sides were unable to reach a compromise on operators' wages and in May of that year, CAT suffered its first strike. Several drivers walked off the job and onto the picket lines, and service had to be suspended on several routes. Coach operators from sister agencies were called in to drive the buses and serve the city before a settlement was reached.

In 2004, CAT received its first shipment of 10 Irisbus Civis bus rapid transit (BRT) vehicles from Irisbus. These buses served on the new Metropolitan Area Express (MAX) route, which serves Nellis Air Force Base via North Las Vegas Boulevard. RTC was a member of the BRT Consortium organized by the Federal Transit Administration (FTA) in 1999. North Las Vegas Boulevard had been restriped in spring 2000, which converted what had been a breakdown lane into a dedicated transit lane; RTC subsequently applied for a federal grant in 2002 under the Bus Rapid Transit Initiative. The Civis featured an optical guidance system (OGS) to automate docking at level-boarding platforms, similar to a light-rail system; however, the OGS proved to be unreliable in service due to the difficulty of maintaining pavement markings. Revenue service on MAX started on June 30, 2004; ridership increased by 25% by the end of 2004, and end-to-end travel times were cut approximately in half, from 50 to 25 minutes.

A year later, CAT received its first shipment of 50 double decker buses from Alexander Dennis. As new vehicles arrived, the RTC started a vehicle replacement program and began to retire its older CAT fleet. In March 2007, CAT received its first shipment of 30 Diesel-Electric Hybrid vehicles from New Flyer. Later that year, an additional 40 double deck vehicles from Alexander Dennis arrived, and the RTC unveiled a new rapid transit system which uses the new Diesel-Hybrid RTV Streetcar from Wright Group. The first line was called the "Gold Line", which serviced the downtown and strip corridors.

RTC Transit era (present) 

In late 2007, the RTC began to rebrand the Citizens Area Transit system as RTC Transit.  The New Flyer 900 series coaches were the last to be purchased with the CAT logo, and the first to be purchased with the RTC logo. The CAT bus stop signs around the city were replaced by "Transit Stop" signs using the RTC logo. All rider alerts, bus announcements, bus books, and new NABI Hybrid, NABI Diesel and New Flyer CNG buses no longer use the CAT logo.

The RTC received 50 NABI vehicles and the final shipment of 40 42 ft "Deuce" double-deck buses in summer 2008. The RTC also began to receive 45 New Flyer CNG vehicles in late fall 2008. The rebranding was completed on January 1, 2009 when RTC vehicles started featuring "RTC TRANSIT" along with the normal route destination headers.  All remaining CAT buses are in the process of retirement or being refurbished to the new RTC gold/blue livery.

In 2007, nine RTC executives received pay raises which averaged 22%. The raises were based on the findings of a consultant, Peter Ronza, who was once employed by Clark County.

The RTC faced serious legal issues in 2008 after several car accidents involving bus shelters occurred. The public demanded that the RTC improve the safety of its shelters, while the RTC stated that there was only so much they could do. The RTC created a Bus Shelter Advisory Committee, and made studies concerning bus stop safety.

In 2009, the RTC raised bus fares despite public outcry. In 2009 and 2010, proposed bus fares increased from 62% for monthly passes to 100% for full day fare passes. The RTC argued that the fare hikes were due to higher fuel costs, however the largest increase in transit expenditures came from a tripling in capital outlays, rising from $54.5 million in 2007 to $162.9 million in 2009. The price for thirty-day bus passes increased 225% from 1999 to 2010. Ridership was at an all-time high in 2008 due to the very high gas prices, with many people deciding to try transit instead. Ridership numbers declined in 2009 when fuel prices dropped back to reasonable levels, and riders either returned to their own vehicles or began carpooling with co-workers and family.

In January 2010, RTC introduced the ACE branding for its bus rapid transit offerings. The first ACE route was the ACE Gold Line, connecting downtown Las Vegas, the Las Vegas Convention Center, the Strip, and the South Strip Transfer Terminal. In addition, ACExpress was introduced as branding for its express bus service, with an express bus line connecting the Centennial Hills neighborhood northwest of the city with downtown Las Vegas, the Center Strip, and UNLV. In May 2010, RTC rebranded its lines away from the "ACE" name due to a lawsuit from Ace Cab, a local Las Vegas taxi operator; ACE Gold became the Strip and Downtown Express (SDX); ACExpress became Centennial Express (CX), and ACE Green became the Boulder Highway Express (BHX)

The Institute for Transportation and Development Policy (ITDP), under its BRT Standard, has classified the Strip and Downtown Express as a "Basic BRT" corridor.

Future 
In 2018, RTC began examining the possibility of installing light rail or enhanced bus rapid transit service along high-ridership routes, particularly the Maryland Parkway corridor.

Operations 
The RTC currently operates 36 routes with 12 routes operating 24 hours a day, seven days a week, including The Deuce on The Strip. Most routes run from early morning (04:00) until late night (01:00). On weekends & holidays, some routes either operate less frequently, operate with less hours, or not operate at all. Las Vegas has one of the most comprehensive night bus networks in the United States, owing to the 24-hour nature of the casinos and hospitality industry.

RTC Transit is the largest outsourced transit operation in the United States, having overtaken the title from the now-defunct Metropolitan Transportation Authority's Long Island Bus service in late 2011. As of 2011, the contract is worth approximately $600 million over seven years. The fixed route system had been operated by Veolia Transport and its predecessors, ATC-Vancom and National Express, since inception. Bus operators, mechanics, and most other contractor employees are represented by Amalgamated Transit Union Local 1637. Paratransit and dial-a-ride services are operated by First Transit.

The fixed route contract was scheduled to expire September 25, 2011, and was awarded to First Transit, the apparent low bidder and highest scorer on the comprehensive review, however, Veolia has complained to the RTC board of bidding irregularities in the First Transit bid as well as an unfair emphasis on price in comparison to other technical factors. The RTC board approved the First Transit bid on a 4-3 vote, but after the Nevada Attorney General reprimanded the RTC for approving the contract without a majority of the eight members on the RTC board (as opposed to merely those present), which was determined by a district court judge that all 8 members were not required and the award was legitimate. However, in the fallout of the court decision, the RTC returned for a re-vote in which the board then deadlocked at 4-4 for multiple months. The RTC board decided that it was best to cancel the award and bring forward a new fresh proposal for bid, and gave Veolia a 1-year extension while the board found a means to obtain a majority to make a decision. First Transit subsequently sued the RTC to force them to make a decision.

In November 2011 First Transit and the RTC settled their lawsuit. First Transit continued to operate the paratransit system and Veolia continued to operate the fixed route bus system until the end of 2012. The new fixed route transit contract will be split into two, to allow smaller vendors to bid. The two contract system is similar to that of Foothill Transit in the Los Angeles area, which is the third largest outsourced fixed route public transit system in the United States.

In December 2012, the contractors for both yards submitted their 1st round proposals with Veolia, Keolis (no relation to Veolia), and MV Transportation advancing to round 2 and First Transit failing to advance. In January 2013, the remaining contractors submitted their final proposals to the board, and on February 14, 2013, the RTC voted to award the Sunset Maintenance Facility to Keolis, and the Simmons Maintenance Facility to MV, beating out the original two contractors. Keolis and MV began operations of RTC Transit on July 7, 2013 at 12:00am.

MV operates routes 101, 102, 105, 106, 110, 111, 113, 115, 120, 121, 203, 206, 207, 208, 209, 210, 214, 215, 218, 219, 603, 604, 607, CX, & DVX. These routes are primarily in the northern portion of the service area. MV also operates the 700 series (Silver Star) routes. Keolis operates routes 103, 104, 108, 109, 117, 119, 122, 201, 202, 212, 217, 401, 402, 601, 602, 605, 606, 608, The Deuce on The Strip, BHX, & SX.  These routes are primarily in the southern portion of the service area. MV also operates RTC Paratransit operations as of March 2020.

Service area 
RTC Transit operates a grid-type system within the Las Vegas Valley, which includes the four incorporated cities of Las Vegas, North Las Vegas, Henderson, and Boulder City; in addition, the remaining service area is in unincorporated Clark County. The system's two busiest routes, The Deuce on The Strip and Route 109 Maryland Parkway, provide service to the Las Vegas Strip and Harry Reid International Airport, respectively.  Approximately 40% of Clark County residents do not live within close proximity of a bus stop.

RTC Transit also operates special routes for occasions such as sporting events at Allegiant Stadium, T-Mobile Arena, and Las Vegas Ballpark.

Route numbers 
100s: Local North/South routes.
200s: Local East/West routes.
300s: "The Deuce" Strip Corridor routes.
400s: Regular Shuttle routes.
500s: Surface Street Express routes.
600s: Special Shuttle routes.
700s: Silver STAR routes.
900s: Freeway Commuter Express routes.
FDRs: Flexible Demand Response routes.

Notes

RTC Paratransit 
Even though all buses in the system have wheelchair lifts, RTC operates RTC Paratransit for people who have difficulty in accessing the regular transit system. By-appointment-only paratransit is a door-to-door service. RTC also maintains an open charge account with a local taxicab company to service paratransit ridership when unforeseen delays occur, frequently caused by traffic congestion.

Fares 
Fares effective as of May 1, 2021

Fixed routes 
For all vehicles, children 5 & younger ride for free with fare-paying rider; 3-kid limit applies.

U-Pass: UNLV, NSC, & CSN Student, Faculty, & Staff 
Purchased through campus bookstore; provides a 50% discount on monthly passes and a 68% discount on semester passes. Valid on all routes.

Paratransit 
Door-to-door service for riders who are unable to use the fixed-route system.
 Fares effective as of July 1, 2013:

Notes

Equipment 
RTC currently operates mainly New Flyer, Alexander Dennis and Wright StreetCar RTV coaches for fixed routes, and mainly Ford Econoline vans for paratransit.

On October 27, 2005, CAT added a fleet of double decker buses on The Strip Route. The route is now called The Deuce.

Active 

On Order 
All vehicles will be wheelchair accessible.

Retired

Color schemes 

The first "mountains" livery used was a white base with a mix of broad teal and magenta stripes, black lining around the windows, and the CAT logo in the midsection body, front, and rear. This livery was used from 1992 to 2001.

In 2001, the second "stripes" livery came in three variants, with the second one being the primary livery. The RTC decided to abandon their teal and magenta color scheme and adopted a white, blue, and gold scheme with blue stripes with a cat running on a white base, white around the windows, moving the CAT logo to just above the first window on either side, under the windshield, and on the engine door (with the exception of the Neoplans which had the logo placed above the rear header). Prior to the arrival of the 2001 New Flyer CNGs and Neoplans, the RTC began repainting the fleet with the blue stripe livery. Once they arrived, the RTC approved a variant to the livery and instead of having just blue stripes, it became blue and gold alternating stripes with the logos in the same positions. The RTC then started repainting coaches with this new variant, leaving the already painted coaches with the 1st variant. This livery was used from 2001 to 2005 on the fixed-route fleet. It is the current livery for the RTC paratransit fleet, using the 2nd variant. Since 2008, a 3rd variant has been used by removing the running cat, having the stripes extend around the vehicle, and replacing the CAT logo with the RTC logo.

In 2004, 10 Irisbus Civis coaches arrived for service on the new BRT line, complete with a new MAX Line "bluenose" livery. It consisted of a blue base, with a white line that stretched the length of the coach, and with gold stars on the rear quarterpanels of each side.

In 2005, the RTC again changed the livery, returning to the first "mountains" livery design using the new color scheme, extending the shapes to the bottom of the vehicle. This livery was only used on the 800 series coaches and on coach 654, and it was only used in 2005. A variant of this livery has the CAT logos replaced with RTC fleet logos on the sides of the coach.

Later in 2005, the RTC received its shipment of 50 double deck Alexander Dennis Enviro500 vehicles, painted in a third "goldbug" livery. This one consisted of an all-gold base, with a blue trim around the bottom, and the transit logo between both decks, under the windshield, and under the engine door. Originally limited to the double deckers, the RTC decided to adopt the "goldbug" scheme for new fleet purchases starting in 2006. For non-double deck vehicles, the CAT logo remained above the windows, but the RTC logo was added to the position where the CAT logo was in 1992. To date, only 2 vehicles that were already part of the fleet have been repainted in this livery variant (buses 571 and 725). The New Flyer 900 series vehicles were the last vehicles with this livery. In 2008, the RTC made a variant of the "goldbug" livery which had the CAT logo removed and replaced by a special RTC logo only used on these buses. Coach 702 has been repainted with this livery variant. In 2009, RTC commissioned another variant of the livery by replacing the special RTC logo with an "RTC Transit" logo on the sides and front of the coach. "Regional Transportation Commission of Southern Nevada" was placed near the bottom of the coach. New "No Right Turn On Red" and "This Bus Stops At All Railroad Crossings" stickers were placed on the rear. The numbers were moved to the right of the front and rear of each coach, and "www.rtcsnv.com" is placed on the rear either on the destination sign just under the screen or on one of the engine doors.

In 2010, a new "goldface" BRT livery was implemented with the Wright StreetCars, which consists of a gold base with a blue stripe and a white stripe; the one-piece windshield is outlined in white.

Bus terminals

South Strip Transfer Terminal 
The South Strip Transfer Terminal (or "SSTT"), owned by the RTC, is located just south of McCarran Airport on Sunset Rd. and Gilespie St. The SSTT was opened in 2003 after the Vacation Village hotel and casino was closed, which was the southern terminus for many CAT routes. The SSTT has 18 transit bays that are serviced by 7 RTC routes, Megabus, which began on December 12, 2012, providing service from the SSTT to Los Angeles via Riverside, & BoltBus to Los Angeles. Both have since ceased operation. In 2008 the Park & Ride lot was expanded, doubling the amount of spaces available in response to the overwhelming use of the lot by commuters heading to the airport.  Amtrak Thruway and Greyhound started using the station in 2021, with Greyhound abandoning its long held station at the Plaza Las Vegas.

SSTT amenities

SSTT Bays

Downtown Transportation Center 

The Downtown Transportation Center (or "DTC") was the main transit center for the RTC systems in downtown Las Vegas. The DTC had 30 numbered bays, and 4 unnumbered bays that serviced 14 RTC routes, and a private Primm employee shuttle route. The DTC was opened in the late 1980s to serve as the main terminal for the Las Vegas City Trolley, and for the private Las Vegas Transit System, Inc. In 1992, it became the terminal for Citizens Area Transit, once Las Vegas Transit ceased operations. Originally, the DTC only had 23 bays, with two of them unnumbered. In 1999, the city expanded the terminal by building a northern plaza which required closing down Mesquite Ave. in the area. The DTC remained under ownership of the City of Las Vegas until July 31, 2009 when the city discontinued their CityRide transit system and transferred control of the terminal to the RTC. The RTC closed the aging terminal on November 7, 2010, with the grand opening of the Bonneville Transit Center.

DTC amenities

Bonneville Transit Center 

The Bonneville Transit Center (or "BTC") is a transit terminal that was built to replace the aging Downtown Transportation Center as the main downtown terminal for local fixed route service. It opened on November 7, 2010 and is located on the corner of Bonneville Ave. and Casino Center Blvd. It has 16 internal bays, 5 external bays, and an air-conditioned lobby for transit riders. The Bonneville Transit Center is served by Deuce On The Strip, Boulder Highway Express (BHX), Centennial Express (CX) and Downtown & Veterans Medical Center Express (DVX). BoltBus to Los Angeles Union Station is accessible on 1st St. @ Bonneville Ave. On December 2, 2018, a new external bay was added.

BTC amenities

BTC Bays

Centennial Hills Transit Center Park & Ride 
The Centennial Hills Transit Center is a transit terminal operated by the RTC to serve the northwest valley and its residents. It includes 900 parking spaces, park & ride, indoor waiting facility, next arrival information and restrooms. Construction began in July 2009, and it opened March 28, 2010 in conjunction with the launch of the ACExpress C-Line (renamed to C-Line Express in May 2010 & Centennial Express in November 2010). The facility is located at Grand Montecito Pkwy. & Elkhorn Rd. Routes that currently serve the Centennial Hills Transit Center are: 106A, 106B, and the Centennial Express (CX).

CHTC amenities

CHTC Bays

Westcliff Transit Center 
The Westcliff Transit Center is a transit terminal built in the valley's west side community of Summerlin. This terminal is the park & ride for the residents of Summerlin and officially opened on December 12, 2010 in conjunction with the launch of the Westcliff Airport Express (WAX) connecting passengers to McCarran Airport & downtown Las Vegas from the valley's west side. Routes 207, 208 & 209 began service here on November 7, 2010. Route 120 began service here on March 2, 2014. Routes 120, 207, & 209 were removed from here while Route 121 began service here on November 8, 2015. On October 4, 2020 the Westcliff Airport Express was officially discontinued.

WTC amenities

WTC Bays

UNLV Transit Center 
The UNLV Transit Center is a transit terminal built on the University of Nevada, Las Vegas campus in Central Las Vegas. It is located near Maryland Pkwy. & University Rd. & officially opened on September 4, 2013. Route 602 (special event service during UNLV football games only) & Centennial Express (CX) began service here on September 5, 2013. Route 109 is available along Maryland Pkwy.

UTC amenities

UTC Bays

Downtown Summerlin Transit Facility 
The Downtown Summerlin Transit Facility serves Downtown Summerlin as well as Las Vegas Ballpark and City National Arena. It is located at Pavilion Center Drive and Summerlin Centre Drive and opened on October 16, 2017. It serves the Sahara Express and route 206.

Accidents and incidents 

9 March 2004 (continued to 2016)
On the afternoon of 9 March, Lorraine Macdonald was cycling towards the Fashion Show Mall alongside a CAT Bus. The bus driver failed to look in her rear view mirror and side-swiped Lorraine Macdonald twice, which did not kill her but left her disable. March 2007, Miss Macdonald took the bus company to court and won the case, however the bus company appealed and the verdict was reversed in the Nevada Supreme Court and another trial ordered. In March 2010, Miss Macdonald went back to court and won the case again which the bus company has again appealed & won.

19 July 2006
On the night of 19 July, Alexander Dennis coach 224 on the "Deuce" service was deadheading north on Interstate 15.  A tire failed and the bus went through an opening in the median barrier rail that had been removed for construction access.  The coach continued through the median and over a barrier on the southbound side of the Interstate.  The coach was spinning clockwise when it was hit by a tractor trailer, which caused the bus to spin the other way and collide again with the trailer before coming to a rest.  Due to the size of the cleanup, and the need to investigate the accident, the road was not reopened until approximately 10:00 am the following morning. The driver of tractor trailer was killed in the accident.  The passenger in the tractor trailer was unrestrained at the time of the accident, and was severely injured.  The driver of the coach was severely injured, and partially disabled.

Following the accident, the coach was retained at the RTC Tompkins yard, covered by a giant tarp to preserve it for inspection during the ongoing investigation and litigation.  Upon closure of the RTC Tompkins facility, the bus was taken from the facility and moved to an off-site storage location. In 2011, with the investigation over, the bus was moved to the RTC Simmons facility where the bus was finally dismantled for any usable parts & eventually scrapped.

Initial investigation revealed concerns about problems with the tire were reported a few times by drivers prior to the accident.  Maintenance records show that each time a problem was reported it was inspected and evaluated by the mechanics.  Additionally, the companies involved in the removal of the barrier were also investigated for contributing to the accident.

3 January 2008

On the night of 3 January, a CAT bus collided through two brick walls before finally hitting a house. Around 9:30 pm, CAT bus 915 on route 207 was heading south on Christy Lane and turning left onto Mabel Road, when the bus hit a Ford Mustang car. This sent the bus out of control and into the brick walls and the house. There were three minor injuries on the bus, and unconfirmed injuries in the Mustang. The bus was not taken off the property until the next morning, because officials were concerned that the bus might have made the house structurally unsafe. Support columns were placed in the house and the bus was removed.

17 March 2008
On the night of 17 March, CAT bus number 653 struck and killed a pedestrian at the intersection of Washington and Rancho.

7 July 2008
On the morning of 7 July, a red truck hit the CAT bus stop on Boulder Highway and Flamingo Road, killing 1 woman and seriously injuring another woman. The driver was arrested and officers said he was under the influence of prescription painkillers.

8 July 2008
The day following a deadly crash at a CAT bus stop, another incident occurred with a naked man stealing a bus. At around 07:30 hours, Charles Sell was near Washington Ave. and Lamb Blvd, when Metro police reported that, while naked, he stole beers from a 7-11, and then proceeded to steal CAT paratransit vehicle 1792. He punched the door glass, boarded, and took control while the bus driver jumped off for safety. A few hundred metres away, he jumped off while the bus continued in motion. A Metro officer boarded and stopped the vehicle where the suspect Charles Sell was arrested by Metro that landed him for booking into the Clark County Detention Centre on charges of Grand Larceny Auto and Robbery.

13 September 2012
On the morning of 13 September, a man in a 2001 Chevy Monte Carlo, crashed into the bus stop at Spring Mountain and Dectaur, killing four, and injuring 8. The impact tore some of the victims to pieces, and hurled some dozens of yards from the point of impact. According to Las Vegas Metropolitan Police Officer Laura Meltzer, it was difficult to determine their identities, but Metro believe all were waiting for the bus. They were identified Thursday night only as three women, ages 65, 49 and 47, plus a 24-year-old man, all of Metropolitan Las Vegas. The man was arrested on suspicion of DUI and was listed in critical condition.

28 January 2013
On the afternoon of 28 January, a woman, driving a 2004 Ford Taurus, crashed into a double decker bus at Charleston and Rainbow, killing herself and injuring 5 people who were on the bus. The people of the bus only suffered minor injuries.

9 January 2016
On the evening of 9 January, a 202 bus heading west hit a bus stop sign, near Boulder Highway and Flamingo Road. The bus was pulling in, and hit the bus stop sign off of the shelter, flinging it on the road. Nobody was injured. However, on the same day, around 5am, a 201B heading east, was pulling up to the curb on Tropicana and Dean Martin Drive. The bus took out the shelter, and doing that, a woman was knocked down and hit by the bus, killing her. (Credit to KTNV 13 for the second story)

References

External links 

 Regional Transportation Commission of Southern Nevada, owns RTC Transit.
 Keolis Transit America, operates RTC Transit Fixed Route Operations (Sunset).
 MV Transportation, operates RTC Transit Fixed Route Operations (Simmons).
 Veolia Transportation, former operator of RTC Transit Fixed Route Operations.
 Transdev, operates RTC Transit Paratransit Operations.
 First Transit, former operator of RTC Transit Paratransit Operations.
 Southern Nevada Transit Coalition, operator of RTC's routes in Laughlin & Mesquite, as well as the Veterans Medical Transportation Network
 Freeway and Arterial System of Transportation (FAST). Department of RTC responsible for traffic camera system.

Bus transportation in Nevada
Intermodal transportation authorities in Nevada
Bus rapid transit in Nevada
Transportation in the Las Vegas Valley
Transit authorities with natural gas buses
1992 establishments in Nevada